Norman Otis "Lefty" Bowers (August 24, 1909 – December 6, 1978), also listed as Chuck Bowers, and Jimmy Bowers, was an American baseball pitcher in the Negro leagues. He played with the Baltimore Black Sox in 1926 and 1927.

Career
Bowers attended Richmond High School in Richmond, Virginia, and at age 17,  he received a tryout with the Baltimore Black Sox. He made his debut in the final game of a series against the Cuban Stars (East). He allowed five hits in six innings, with the game being called at that point due to darkness. He then earned a contract, and pitched in at least five recorded games over two seasons with Baltimore.

References

External links
 and Seamheads

Baltimore Black Sox players
1909 births
1978 deaths
Baseball players from Richmond, Virginia
Baseball pitchers
20th-century African-American sportspeople